The European Health Examination Survey (EHES) is an ongoing series of large-scale clinical epidemiological studies. It is a cooperative effort among multiple European nations, in concert with the European Union (EU), the European Economic Area (EEA) and the European Free Trade Area (EFTA). While actual data collection is carried out through the health ministries of each participating nation, the coordination of these efforts across borders is under the jurisdiction of the European Commission's Directorate-General for Health and Food Safety.

Overview 
A health examination survey consists of the collection of both interview data (in the form of a self-guided questionnaire, an interview with a medical professional, or both) and physical examination data such as blood testing and weight measurement.

The EHES is officially a project of the European Commission's Directorate-General Santé et Consommateurs (Directorate-General for Health and Consumers, DG SANCO). It is a goal of the EHES project to include HES participation from all EU, EEA and EFTA countries.

The importance of medical examination data that can be correlated across populations, and EHES's contributions in that regard, have been noted by a number of healthcare researchers and policymakers.

EHES data have furthermore been used as the basis for more specific studies, such as examination of issues in participation rates in healthcare surveys and identification of groups with risk factors for metabolic syndrome.

History 
National-level Health Examination Surveys (HES) had been carried out by multiple European countries beginning in the late 1950s, with increased interest in conducting HESs by national governments beginning around the year 2000, but there was no standardisation of parameters between countries prior to 2009. With nearly 20 European countries planning to conduct their own HESs within a five-year window, it was decided that standardization of survey protocols was a priority.

FEHES 

From 2006–2008, the feasibility of creating a single standardized HES for all European Union (EU) member nations and all members of the European Free Trade Association/European Economic Area (EFTA/EEA) was evaluated by the Feasibility of the European Health Examination Survey (FEHES) Project. This project concluded that such a standardized HES was indeed feasible, and proposed a two-phase approach to the EHES project. Phase one would involve establishing centralized coordination for the project, conducting pilot surveys for an initial 8–12 nations, and designing and preparing full-scale surveys for those initial HESs. Phase two would involve carrying out the full-scale surveys in the initial 8–12 nations, and coordinating the design and preparation of full-scale surveys in the other European countries.

FEHES also made recommendations regarding data management; documentation and reporting; establishing and maintaining international collaboration; ethical and legal issues; measurements to be included in the pilot HESs; models for the organization of national HES infrastructure; recruitment or study participants; sampling issues; and standardization of measurement protocols.

The countries expected to be part of an eventual Europe-wide Health Examination Survey as of 2008 were Austria, Belgium, Bulgaria, Croatia, Cyprus, the Czech Republic, Denmark, Estonia, France, Germany, Greece, Hungary, Iceland, Ireland, Italy, Latvia, Lithuania, Luxembourg, the former Yugoslavian Republic of Macedonia, Malta, the Netherlands, Norway, Poland, Portugal, Romania, Slovakia, Slovenia, Spain, Sweden, Turkey, and the United Kingdom.

The EHES pilot program 
The pilot project for the European HES, funded by the European Commission, was carried out from 2009–2012. Coordination for the pilot project was administered by the EHES Pilot Reference Centre (EHES RC), a collaboration between Finland's National Institute for Health and Welfare (THL), Italy's Istituto Superiore di Sanità (ISS), and Norway's Statistics Norway (SSB).

EHES RC created a centralised system for data management and reporting of survey data, designed and produced training seminars for participating countries, provided logistical support to countries participating in the pilot studies, published standardized HES protocols in an EHES Manual, and supervised both internal and external quality control for the EHES. The EHES Manual defined protocols for health measurements, described organization of the fieldwork, discussed ethical issues, established definitions of data-reporting indicators, included information on sampling, and provided "other details relating to the planning and conducting of a national HES." The final version of the EHES Manual incorporated revisions based on discoveries made during the pilot program.

Pilot project preliminary surveys were carried out in 12 countries: the Czech Republic, Finland, Germany, Greece, Italy, Malta, the Netherlands, Norway, Poland, Portugal, Slovakia, and the UK. (In Germany, Italy, the Netherlands and the UK, HESs were already under way when the pilot program began, thus the primary focus of the pilot program in those countries was evaluating the feasibility of converting the existing programs to match the EHES standards.) Initially, Hungary and Spain were going to be included in the pilot project as well, but logistical problems prevented their participation. The countries included were chosen based on their either already having begun a national HES, or being in the early planning stages for such a survey. These pilot studies established standardised protocols for the measurement of key risk factors for chronic disease, such as blood lipids, blood glucose, blood pressure, height, waist circumference and weight. Standardised questions for the questionnaire portion of the EHES were also developed, covering such topics as current health status, smoking history, socio-economic status, and use of health care services; as much as possible, questions conformed to the European Health Interview Survey.

Plans for training of personnel were developed, as were plans for external quality assessment. The minimum sample size in each pilot project country was 200 individuals between 25 and 64 years of age. The pilot survey project succeeded at standardizing HES measurements across populations despite participant countries having differing cultural settings, economic statuses, infrastructures and levels of previous experience conducting an HES.

Participation by country

Notes

References

External links 
EHES Official website
FEHES Official website

Individual countries' HES sites 
Studie zur Gesundheit Erwachsener in Deutschland (German Health Interview and Examination Survey)
Osservatorio epidemiologico cardiovascolare (Italian Observatory Epidemiological Cardiovascular Survey)
De Maat Genomen (Netherlands HES)

Epidemiological study projects
European Commission projects
European medical and health organizations
Medical research organizations
Non-profit organizations based in Europe